Rodolfo Morales (May 8, 1925 – January 30, 2001) was a Mexican painter, who incorporated elements of magic realism into his work.

Morales is best known for his brightly colored surrealistic dream-like canvases and collages often featuring Mexican women in village settings. He was notable for his restoration of historic buildings in Ocotlán de Morelos and, together with Rufino Tamayo and Francisco Toledo, helped make Oaxaca in Southern Mexico a centre for contemporary art and tourism.  Up until his death in 2001, both he and Toledo had been regarded as Mexico’s greatest living artists for over a decade.

Early years
A Zapotec Native American, born to working class parents in the small town of Ocotlán de Morelos, Morales was an often solitary child who found comfort in drawing. From 1948 to 1953 he studied art at the Academy of San Carlos in Mexico City. He graduated as a drawing teacher and began a 32-year career as an art teacher at Escuela Nacional Preparatoria, a position he held from 1953 until 1985.

In 1965 while organizing a Christmas party at the home of a sculptor friend, Geles Cabrera, he used collages as decorations. She liked his works and suggested a trade: a piece of sculpture for a painting. This recognition stimulated Morales to focus all his efforts on painting and, to make extra money, he organized exhibitions of his work in small galleries around the capital.

In 1975 with Morales approaching 50, he was persuaded by Cabrera to hold his first mainstream solo exhibition at the Casa de las Campanas Art Gallery in Cuernavaca. Here his paintings came to the attention of famous Mexican painter Rufino Tamayo. Tamayo helped Morales make contacts with art critics and galleries around the world, leading to a number of joint and solo exhibitions.

Later years

By 1985, Morales had earned enough money to stop teaching and to return to Oaxaca where he was able to dedicate himself to both his art and to restoration.  Using income from his art he founded the Rodolfo Morales Cultural Foundation devoted to restoration of buildings in his hometown of Ocotlán. In all, he funded the restoration of fifteen churches including the 16th century Convent of Santo Domingo and a 17th-century church in the town of Santa Ana Zegache, as well creating  cultural spaces throughout Oaxaca's central valleys.  His most important restoration project was the former convent of Ocotlan which was converted into a municipal complex.

Morales ensured that much of the restoration work done was by local women who, by developing skills, were able to later find employment elsewhere. His other notable Foundation work included setting up a computer room for local youths to learn information technology skills, providing materials to aspiring artists, producing of prints to help Frente Común Contra SIDA educate against the spread of AIDS and planting new copal trees not only to enhance the landscape but also to provide wood for the creation of hand-painted animals.

Whilst continuing with his art, he would begin each day by making a small collage which he would sell to raise money for his Foundation.

He died on January 30, 2001, at the age of 75 in Oaxaca from pancreatic cancer. His remains were placed in his restored Convent of Santo Domingo, in Ocotlán, Oaxaca.

Artistic style and technique
Morales’ work has been described as dream-like, fertile and heavily based in folklore.  It often depicts indigenous people, especially women set amongst rural buildings, churches, town squares and arcaded shops.  His style is influenced by María Izquierdo (1902-1955) and French painter Marc Chagall (1887-1985).

Women and memories appear to be at the heart of his work.  Morales once explained, “Mexico would be lost without the steadfast work of women. They bear the burden of day-to-day living and find solutions to those problems to which men simply resign themselves.”  In a 1995 interview Morales explained, "I came here to live in my memories. . . Nostalgia and melancholy are very important to me."  Despite this, Morales avoided discussing the “meaning” of his work, often producing works without title.

Characteristics of his work include rich use of colour, exaggerated hands and feet, over-sized faces, women (often brides), puppies, flowers, angels, bicycles, musical instruments and the dreamy floating of figures.

Whilst the bulk of his work was oil on canvas he also produced a number of murals, highly decorated pieces of wooden furniture and characteristic cardboard pillars which, when arranged together, create a changing kaleidoscope of image and colour as the viewer walks around them.  Added to this were his many collages, some sold as fund raisers but others, often in a set and in greater detail, arranged to tell a story.  In 1998 the Children’s Book Press published Angel’s Kite illustrated by Morales in the form of collage.

Exhibitions and murals

Notable Individual Exhibits
1973 Provincial Palace of Málaga, Málaga, Spain
1975 Casa de las Campanas, Cuernavaca, Morelos
1976 Galeria del Circulo, Mexico City
1978 Galeria Miro, Monterrey, Mexico
1978 Mexican Museum, San Francisco, California
1978 Estella Shapiro Gallery, Mexico City
1979 Club de Industriales, Monterrey, Mexico
1980 Instituto Nacional de Bellas Artes, Mexico City
1981 Downtown Gallery, Fort Worth, Texas
1981 National Polytechnic Institute, Mexico City
1982 Estella Shapiro Gallery, Mexico City
1983 Museo de Arte Contemporáneo de Monterrey, Monterrey
1986 Galeria Los Principes, Oaxaca, Mexico
1986 Taller Artes Plasticas Rufino Tamayo, Oaxaca, Mexico
1986 Magic and Mystery, Galeria Centro Cultural, Mexico City
1988 Vorpal Gallery, SoHo, New York
1989 Vorpal Gallery, SoHo, New York
1990 Vorpal Gallery, San Francisco
1990 Estella Shapiro Gallery, Mexico City
1993 Ramis Barquet, Monterrey, Nuevo Leon, Mexico
1995 Dreams of a Village, Riva Yares Gallery, Santa Fe, New Mexico
1996 Dreams of a Village, Riva Yares Gallery, Scottsdale, Arizona
1996 Opening Exhibition, Mexican Museum, San Francisco then touring the United States and Canada
2006 'Rodolfo Morales: Master of Dreams, Monterrey, Mexico City, Guadalajara, Bogotá, Los Angeles

Group Exhibits
1981 Five Mexican Painters, Tampa Museum of Art, Tampa, Florida
1981 National Bank of Mexico City, Mexico City
1982 Artists of Oaxaca, Metropolitan Museum, Mexico City
1982 Mexican Museum, San Francisco, California
1983 Galeria Metropolitana, Universidad Autonoma, Mexico City
1983 Casa de la Cultura Jaliscience, Guadalajara, Mexico
1984 Galeria Uno, Puerto Vallarta, Mexico
1985 Galeria Metropolitana, Universidad Autonoma, Mexico City
1986 Museo de Arte Moderno, Mexico City
1987 La Plastica Oaxaquena, Galeria del Auditoria Nacional, Mexico City
1987 Galeria d'Art de Oaxaca, Oaxaca, Mexico
1990 The Heart of Mexico, Riva Yares Gallery, Scottsdale, Arizona
1990 Aspects of Contemporary Mexican Art,  Americas Society, New York City then traveling to Blue Star Art Space, San Antonio, Texas; Meadows Museum, Dallas, Texas; Santa Monica Museum of Art, Santa Monica, California; Mexican Museum, San Francisco, California
1990 Life, Legends and Dreams - Six Painters from Oaxaca, Arizona State University Art Museum, Tempe, Arizona
1990 The Heard Museum, Phoenix, Arizona
1991 The Charm of Oaxaca, Museo de Arte Contemporáneo de Monterrey, Monterrey
1992 New Territories 350/500 years later, Montreal, Quebec, Canada and Regional Museum of Oaxaca
1992 Mito y Magia en America: Los Ochenta, Museo de Arte Contemporáneo de Monterrey, Monterrey
1993 Death in Mexican Culture, Stuttgart, Germany
1993 Oaxaca: Tierra de Colores, Banco Nacional de Obras, Mexico City
1994 Myth and Magic: Oaxaca Past and Present'', at the Palo Alto Art Center, Palo Alto, California

Murals
1954 Municipal Palace of Ocotlán de Morelos, Oaxaca, Mexico
1962 Escuela Preparatoria No. 5, Mexico City
1980 Municipal Palace of Ocotlán de Morelos, Oaxaca, Mexico
1980 Rincon de los Bosques Restaurant, Mexico City (two murals)
1986 Fresco at Escuela Preparatoria No. 5, Mexico City
1994 Sheraton Hotel, Mexico City

Legacy
The work of the Rodolfo Morales Foundation continues today attempting to preserve the heritage of Oaxaca and fostering the arts. The Spring Festival in Oaxaca was renamed the Spring Festival Rodolfo Morales in his honour following his death.

References

                   

1925 births
2001 deaths
20th-century Mexican painters
Mexican muralists
Gay painters
Mexican LGBT painters
Deaths from pancreatic cancer
People from Mexico City
People from Oaxaca
Zapotec people
Deaths from cancer in Mexico
Latin American artists of indigenous descent
20th-century Indigenous Mexican painters
Mexican male painters
20th-century indigenous painters of the Americas
20th-century Native Americans
20th-century Mexican LGBT people
20th-century Mexican male artists